Derevnya penkozavoda is a rural locality (a village) in Diyashevsky Selsoviet, Bakalinsky District, Bashkortostan, Russia. The population was 129 as of 2010. There are 3 streets.

Geography 
The village is located 13 km southwest of Bakaly (the district's administrative centre) by road. Diyashevo is the nearest rural locality.

References 

Rural localities in Bakalinsky District